The Han family of Lasem, also called the Han family of East Java or Surabaya, was an influential family of the 'Cabang Atas' or the Chinese gentry of the Dutch East Indies (today known as Indonesia). They came to power in the Indies through their alliance with the Dutch East India Company in the 18th century. Originally from Lasem in Central Java, they figured prominently in the consolidation of Dutch rule in East Java and maintained a long tradition of government service as Kapitan Cina and priyayi in the Dutch colonial bureaucracy.

Founding and history of the family
The family is descended from Han Siong Kong (1673-1743), who migrated to Lasem from Zhangzhou, Fujian, Qing Empire; and from the 12th-century Chinese mandarin Han Hong. Their first attested ancestor, the 7th-century military leader Han Zhaode, was a general in the army of the warlord Chen Yuanguang (657–711) who pacified Fujian for the Tang dynasty.

Two of Han Siong Kong's sons, by a daughter of the regent of Rajegwesi according to J. Hageman, played a prominent role in consolidating Dutch rule in East Java in the 18th century. The elder, Soero Pernollo (1720 – 1776), converted to Islam, and served the Dutch East India Company as police chief, harbourmaster of Surabaya and bureaucrat. The younger, Han Bwee Kong (1727 – 1778), became the earliest recorded Dutch-appointed Kapitein der Chinezen, or head of the Chinese community, of Surabaya.

The family reached the peak of their power in the late 18th and early 19th century, in particular during the Interregnum. Allied with Herman Willem Daendels, the Napoleonic governor-general of the Dutch East Indies, the grandsons of Han Siong Kong ruled much of the Eastern Salient of Java as landlords, Chinese officers and regents. One of the grandsons, Han Chan Piet, Majoor der Chinezen (1759 – 1827) purchased from Daendels the districts of Besuki and Panarukan in 1810, while his younger brother, Majoor Han Kik Ko (1766–1813), acquired the district of Probolinggo later that same year. Their cousins from the Muslim branch of the family, Adipati Soero Adinegoro (1752–1833) and Raden Soero Adiwikromo, ruled vast territories as part of the Javanese bureaucracy.

In 1813, however, a revolt — the so-called 'Kepruk Cina' — broke out against the family that led to the government's eventual reacquisition of the most important Han domains. This was followed in 1818 by a purge of nearly all Muslim members of the Han family from the colonial bureaucracy.

Nonetheless, the family managed to reestablish their power base, and remained influential as landowners and in public administrators in Surabaya and East Java until the Indonesian revolution (1945—1950). Indeed, in Han Tjiong Khing (1866—1933), the family provided Surabaya with its last Majoor der Chinezen. Beyond East Java, prominent branches were also established in Batavia, Semarang and Aceh in the second half of the nineteenth century. The prominent politician Hok Hoei Kan (1881—1951), member of the Volksraad, chair of Chung Hwa Hui (CHH) and community leader, belonged through his father to the Batavia branch of the family. Kan's distant cousin, parliamentary and CHH colleague Han Tiauw Tjong belonged to the Aceh branch of the family.

Notable members
 Adipati Soero Adinegoro or Han Sam Kong (1752–1833), Chinese-Javanese nobleman and bureaucrat 
 Han Chan Piet, Majoor-titulair der Chinezen of Besuki and Panarukan (1759–1827), bureaucrat and landlord
 Han Kik Ko, Majoor-titulair der Chinezen, Regent of Probolinggo (1766–1813), bureaucrat and landlord
 Han Oen Lee, Lieutenant der Chinezen of Bekasi (1856—1893), bureaucrat and landlord
 Han Tjiong Khing, Majoor der Chinezen of Surabaya (1866—1933), bureaucrat
 Hok Hoei Kan (1881—1951), colonial politician, member of the Volksraad and landlord
 Han Tiauw Tjong (1894 – 1940), colonial politician, member of the Volksraad
 Ong Hok Ham (1933—2007), historian

Gallery

References

 
Cabang Atas
Kapitan Cina
Indonesian people of Chinese descent
People of the Dutch East Indies
Indonesian families
Chinese families